Shanghai Commune may mean:
 Shanghai Commune of 1927, established through a workers movement organised by the Communist Party of China
 Shanghai People's Commune, established during the Cultural Revolution